Antonio Álvarez may refer to:
Antonio Álvarez de Toledo, 5th Duke of Alba (1568–1639), Spanish nobleman and politician
Antonio Álvarez Jonte (1784–1820), Argentine politician
Antonio Álvarez (footballer, born 1955), Spanish footballer
 Antonio Álvarez Desanti (born 1958), Costa Rican businessman and politician 
Antonio Álvarez Pérez (born 1975), Spanish footballer 
Antonio Enrique Álvarez (born 1979), former Venezuelan baseball player and politician
 Antonio Alvarez II, co-founder of Alvarez and Marsal

See also
Tony Alvarez (disambiguation)